is a dam in Midori-ku, Sagamihara, Kanagawa Prefecture, Japan.

Dams in Kanagawa Prefecture
Dams completed in 1965
1965 establishments in Japan